Molybdenum cofactor biosynthesis protein 1 is a protein that in humans and other animals, fungi, and cellular slime molds, is encoded by the MOCS1 gene.

Both copies of this gene are defective in patients with molybdenum cofactor deficiency, type A.

Molybdenum cofactor biosynthesis is a conserved pathway leading to the biological activation of molybdenum. The protein encoded by this gene is involved in molybdopterin biosynthesis. (This gene was originally thought to produce a bicistronic mRNA with the potential to produce two proteins (MOCS1A and MOCS1B) from adjacent open reading frames. However, only the first open reading frame (MOCS1A) has been found to encode a protein from the putative bicistronic mRNA.) Two of the splice variants found for this gene express proteins (MOCS1A-MOCS1B) that result from a fusion between the two open reading frames.

References

Further reading